is located in Kotobashi, Sumida, Tokyo, Japan. It has 765 beds and is run by the Tokyo Metropolitan Government.

History
The hospital was established on 1 April 1961 through the merger of two hospitals in Sumida ward.

Campus
The hospital campus comprises three interconnected medical blocks. A helicopter pad is located on the roof of the tallest block.

The newest block was completed in 2014. It was designed by K.ITO Architects & Engineers.

Departments

Transport
The hospital is within walking distance of Kinshichō Station.

See also
 List of hospitals in Japan

References

External links
 

Hospitals in Tokyo
Hospitals established in 1961
Government of Tokyo
Buildings and structures in Sumida, Tokyo
1961 establishments in Japan